XEEST-AM is a radio station on 1440 AM in Mexico City. The station airs Christian programming under the name "Ondas de Vida".

History
XELZ-AM received its first concession on December 1, 1942, to María Cardona de Zetina. For most of its history under this callsign, it broadcast ranchera music and was known as "Radio LZ". It was sold to Radio Variedades, S.A. in 1961, and became a part of Grupo Radio Centro. In the late 1970s, the tropical format Radio AI changed from 1320 AM to 1440.

By the 1980s, it had adopted the XEEST-AM callsign and was known as "Estudiantes AM", targeting a youth audience with pop in Spanish. This format evolved into "Radio 14-40" in the mid-80s with Spanish-language rock joining the musical mix. Yet again, in 1989, the station changed names, this time to "Radio Alegría", but kept its format, eventually incorporating the wave of Spanish-language rap. In 1993, the format was changed and the station became "Radio Éxitos" (a name that had been used on XERC-AM until 1988), with 1960s classic rock in English.

In 1996, Grupo Radio Centro ceded the station's operational control to Grupo Radial Siete, after having taken control of XHFO-FM three years earlier. Under Radial Siete, the station changed yet again, to "Sonido Crystal" with a grupera format; in 1998, it became the news-oriented "Radio Noticias 14-40". By 2005, it offered ballads and spoken programs as "La Reina del Hogar"; this changed to the all-spoken "Cambio 14-40" in 2007. The station took on its current format in 2012; for the first two months as a romantic station, it was known as "Radio Amor 14-40" but not long after changed to its current name, possibly to avoid confusion with XHSH-FM, known as "Amor 95.3".

On May 15, 2017, Quiéreme moved from XEEST to the stronger XEINFO-AM 1560. The move took place the same day as a major reshuffle of the AM stations owned by Grupo Radio Centro. XEEST returned to the air on October 2 after having been relocated to a new transmitter site in the Atlazolpa neighborhood of Mexico City, shared with Radio Centro's XEQR-AM 1030 and unrelated station XEITE-AM 830. However, on October 2, 2017, Quiéreme reverted to XEEST-AM as XEINFO-AM licensee was granted the migration of the station to the FM band as XHINFO-FM 105.3.

At 7pm on February 14, 2019, Quiéreme moved to XEITE-AM 830, and 1440 fell silent again.

In August 2019, GRC officially ceded the ownership of XEEST to Grupo Siete, after the latter also resumed operations of its own XHFO-FM; the concession transfer was approved by the IFT on September 2, 2020.

On February 15, 2020, XEEST returned to the air with the Christian format "Ondas de Paz". The name changed to Ondas de Vida on March 22, 2021, with a change in management but retaining the format.

References

1942 establishments in Mexico
Christian radio stations in Mexico
Radio stations established in 1942
Radio stations in Mexico City
Spanish-language radio stations